Anja Jul Andersen (born 15 February 1969 in Odense, Denmark) is a former Danish team handball player and current coach. She is an Olympic champion, World champion and two times European champion. In 1997, she was named IHF World Player of the Year. She is widely regarded as one of the best female handball players of all time.

Career

Anja Andersen is known for her skills as an offensive player, as well as her strong temper and courage to make dramatic scenes and daring tricks during a match. She was an important part of the renaissance in Danish handball during the 1990s. Her temper and impressive skills afforded everybody an opinion and after the first gold medal at the European championship in 1994 the national team affectionately earned the nickname "the iron ladies" and status of national sports heroes.

Although the national handball team of the 1990s had many profiles it is undisputed that Andersen was the most prolific and controversial. Although nobody questioned her skills, her temper, causing numerous expulsions from high-profile matches, was an issue of some debate. During the 1996 Summer Olympics the Danish coach, Ulrik Wilbek, briefly banned her from the team due to disputes of her playing style and behavior on the floor.

She has played 133 matches for the Danish national handball team for women and has scored 725 goals.

It was also Andersen who introduced handball to true showmanship. Greatly influenced by basketball and notably the Harlem Globetrotters she invented a playing style aimed at the audience rather than the opposing team. After her retirement as an active player she organized a "dream team" of the best female handball players in 2000 and 2001 which played a selected Danish team. The "dream team" matches were a success but they stopped when Andersen could no longer play actively herself.

Because of a heart defect, Andersen stopped her player career in 1999.

Coaching
Andersen immediately started coaching the Danish Women's Handball League club Slagelse. She first helped the team reach the top league and later win the Champions League three times, in 2003/04, 2004/05 and 2006/07. In 2006, she also coached the national team of Serbia.

In 2008, she left Slagelse for FCK Håndbold. In 2010, she left FCK Håndbold because the club dissolved and decided to take a break before coaching a new team.

In February 2011, Andersen became the new coach of Oltchim Râmnicu Vâlcea. The Romanian club hired her in the attempt of winning the Champions League.

In March 2011, after less than two months of coaching, she was fired because of poor results, losing two matches from a total of four on the bench of Oltchim in the main round of the Champions League.

Achievements and recognition

Achievements
During her active career as a handball player she won numerous tournaments:
 1987 World Junior Championship silver medalist
 1992 Norwegian League champion with Bækkelaget
 1993 World Women's Handball Championship silver medalist
 1994 European Women's Handball Championship gold medalist
 1995 World Women's Handball Championship bronze medalist
 1996 Summer Olympics gold medalist
 1996 European Women's Handball Championship gold medalist
 1997 World Women's Handball Championship gold medalist
 1997 IHF World Player of the Year player (As of 2022 she is the only Danish female player besides Goalkeeper, Sandra Toft, to win this title, and until 1 March 2012, when Mikkel Hansen won the title, she was the only Danish player, male or female, who had ever won).

Her career as a coach has also yielded results:
 2003, 2005 and 2007 winner of the Danish Women's Handball League with Slagelse
 2004, 2005, 2007 winner of EHF Women's Champions League with Slagelse

Recognition
 1994: Named the world's second best handball player
 1997: Named the world's best handball player
 2007: Recorded in the Danish Hall of Fame
 2009: Mathilde Prize for challenging the convention of coaches of elite athletes.

References 

1969 births
Living people
Sportspeople from Odense
Danish female handball players
Danish handball coaches
Olympic handball players of Denmark
Handball players at the 1996 Summer Olympics
Olympic gold medalists for Denmark
Olympic medalists in handball
Danish expatriates in Serbia
Danish expatriate sportspeople in Romania
Medalists at the 1996 Summer Olympics
Handball coaches of international teams